Frank Stanton may refer to:
 Frank Stanton (executive) (1908–2006), president of CBS, 1946–1973
 Frank Stanton (entrepreneur) (1921–1999), entrepreneur and real-estate investor who was a pioneer in audio and video cassette systems
 Frank Stanton (rugby league) (born 1940), Australian rugby league player and coach
 Frank Lebby Stanton (1857–1927), songwriter and first poet laureate of Georgia